Valerii Ivanovich Postoyanov (11 October 1941 – 7 February 2018) was a Russian competitive rifleman. He was the winner of the Honored Master of Sports of the USSR in 1970. He competed in the 50 metre running target event at the 1972 Summer Olympics, where he finished in fourth place and two points shy of achieving a bronze medal.

References

1941 births
2018 deaths
Soviet male sport shooters
Olympic shooters of the Soviet Union
Shooters at the 1972 Summer Olympics
Sportspeople from Irkutsk